Roberto Bautista-Agut was the defending champion but chose to participate at the 2013 Crédit Agricole Suisse Open Gstaad instead.

Filippo Volandri won the title, defeating Pere Riba in the final, 6–4, 7–6(9–7).

Seeds

Draw

Finals

Top half

Bottom half

References
 Main Draw
 Qualifying Draw

Trofeo Stefano Bellaveglia - Singles
2013 Singles